Narcissus cuatrecasasii is a species of the genus Narcissus (daffodils) in the family Amaryllidaceae. It is classified in Section Jonquilla. It is a native of the southern Iberian peninsula.

References 

cuatrecasasii
Garden plants
Flora of Spain